. Notable people with the surname include:
 Don Robey (1903–1975), American record executive
 George Robey (1869–1954), English music hall comedian
 James N. Robey (born 1941), American politician
 Louise Robey (born 1960), British/French-Canadian writer/illustrator/singer and actress
 Nickell Robey (born 1992), American football cornerback
 Ralph Mayer Robey (1809–1864), Australian politician and businessman
 Simon Robey (born 1960), British investment banker

See also
 Robey & Co, English engineering company
 Damen (CTA Brown Line) or Damen (CTA Blue Line), stations on the Chicago 'L' that were originally named "Robey" because of the original name of the street on which they are located
 Roby (disambiguation)